NTBC may stand for:

 National Technology Business Centre, a Zambia government agency
 Nitisinone, a chemical drug